Tear, tears or tearing may refer to:

 Tearing, the act of breaking apart a material by force
 Tears, a clear liquid secreted by the tear gland in the eyes of land mammals

Arts and entertainment

Literature
 "Tears", a poem by Edward Thomas
 "Tears", a poem by Walt Whitman

Music

Groups and labels
 The Tears, an English rock band

Albums
 Tears (Paul Bley album)
 Tears (The Crocodiles album)
 Tears (The Crüxshadows album), 2001
 Tears (Joseph Williams album)
 Tears, album by Fumiya Fujii
 Love Yourself: Tear, a 2018 album by the South Korean boy band BTS

Songs
 "Tear", a song by Lotion from Full Isaac, 1993
 "Tear", a song by Smashing Pumpkins from Adore, 1998
 "Tear", a song by Red Hot Chili Peppers from By the Way, 2002
 "Tears" (Ken Dodd song), 1965
 "Tears" (Rush song), 1976
 "Tears" (X Japan song), 1993
 "Tears" (Fayray song), 2000
 "Tears" (Clean Bandit song) featuring Louisa Johnson, 2016
 "Tears", a song by The Stone Roses from Second Coming, 1994
 ”Tears!” a song by 5 Seconds Of Summer from 5SOS5
 "Tears", a song by Rockell from Instant Pleasure, 2000
 "Tears", a song by Aly & AJ from Insomniatic, 2007
 "Tears", a song by Charli XCX from Pop 2, 2017
 "Tears", a song by Underground Solution featuring Colour Girl, 1998
 "Tears", a song by Tinie Tempah featuring Cleo Sol, 2007
 "Tears", a song by Health from the Max Payne 3 soundtrack, 2012
 "Tears", a jazz song performed by guitarist Django Reinhardt
 "Tearz", a song by Wu-Tang Clan from Enter the Wu-Tang (36 Chambers), 1993
 "Outro: Tear", a 2018 song by BTS from the album Love Yourself: Tear

Other uses in arts and entertainment
 Tear (scratch), a type of scratch used by turntablists
 Tear (Wheel of Time), a fictitious nation in Wheel of Time series of novels
 Tears (film), a 2000 South Korean film directed by Im Sang-soo

People
 Robert Tear (1939–2011), a Welsh singer
 Amanda Tears, Belgian drag queen

See also 
Rip and Tear (disambiguation)
Tare (disambiguation)
Screen tearing, a visual display artifact 
Tearfund, a British charity
 Tears for Fears, an English pop rock band